Lalard is a village in Peyrajeh Rural District, in the Central District of Neka County, Mazandaran Province, Iran. At the 2006 census, its population was 334, in 79 families.

References 

Populated places in Neka County